Kirkland Township is one of twelve townships in Adams County, Indiana. As of the 2010 census, its population was 929.

Geography

Unincorporated towns
 Curryville
 Honduras
 Peterson
(This list is based on USGS data and may include former settlements.)

Adjacent townships
 Preble Township (north)
 Root Township (northeast)
 Washington Township (east)
 Monroe Township (southeast)
 French Township (south)
 Harrison Township, Wells County (southwest)
 Lancaster Township, Wells County (west)
 Jefferson Township, Wells County (northwest)

Cemeteries
The township contains these cemeteries: Pleasant Dale (Steele), Shady, St. Luke UCC, and Zion (Cline).

Major highways

School districts
 Adams Central Community Schools

Political districts
 Indiana's 6th congressional district
 State House District 79
 State Senate District 19

References
 
 United States Census Bureau 2007 TIGER/Line Shapefiles
 United States National Atlas

External links
 Indiana Township Association
 United Township Association of Indiana

Townships in Adams County, Indiana
Townships in Indiana